Eatonton is a city in and county seat of Putnam County, Georgia, United States. As of the 2020 census, the city had a population of 6,307. It was named after William Eaton, an officer and diplomat involved in the First Barbary War. The name consists of his surname with the English suffix "ton," meaning "town".

History 
The Rock Eagle Effigy Mound, a Native American archaeological site, is located north of the city. It is one of two such sites east of the Mississippi River; both are in Putnam County. The mound and related earthwork constructions were made by Woodland culture peoples, perhaps as long ago as 1,000 to 3,000 years. The site is situated within a 1500-acre park administered by the University of Georgia, which also maintains a 4-H camp nearby. The Mound has been listed on the National Register of Historic Places.

Following the American Revolutionary War, Eatonton was founded in 1807 as the seat of newly formed Putnam County. After the war, settlers were moving west and settling in the upland Piedmont region to develop cotton plantations. Eatonton was incorporated as a town in 1809 and as a city in 1879.

In a 5-hour period in May 1919, five black churches and two black lodges in Eatonton were burned to the ground, but authorities did not charge anyone with arson.

On November 22, 1992, an F4 tornado with winds up to 260 mph hit the south portions of the city. The storm caused $27,000,000 in damages to houses and businesses. The tornado killed five locals and injured 86 victims.

In the 21st century, Eatonton is known as the "Dairy Capital of Georgia" (in honor of its major industry, dairy farming).

Geography
Eatonton is located at  (33.326302, -83.387798).

The city is located in the central part of the state along U.S. Routes 129 and 441, which meet in and form the western boundary of the city. Via U.S. 129/441, Madison is 22 mi (35 km) north. After leaving the city southward, U.S. 129 runs southwest 25 mi (40 km) to Gray and U.S. 441 runs southeast 21 mi (34 km) to Milledgeville. Georgia State Routes 16 and 44 are the main roads through the center of town, with GA-16 leading east 27 mi (43 km) to Sparta and west 18 mi (29 km) to Monticello, and GA-44 leading northeast 23 mi (37 km) to Greensboro.

Demographics

2020 census

As of the 2020 United States census, there were 6,307 people, 2,559 households, and 1,756 families residing in the city.

2000 census
As of the census of 2000, there were 6,760 people, 2,553 households, and 1,817 families residing in the city. The racial makeup of the city was 35.50% White and 64.50% African American.

There were 2,553 households, out of which 34.9% had children under the age of 18 living with them, 40.4% were married couples living together, 24.0% had a female householder with no husband present, and 30.1% were non-families. 26.2% of all households were made up of individuals, and 10.0% had someone living alone who was 65 years of age or older.  The average household size was 2.66 and the average family size was 3.20.

In the city, the population was spread out, with 9.8% from 18 to 24, 29.3% from 25 to 44, 20.3% from 45 to 64, and 12.0% who were 65 years of age or older.  The median age was 34 years. For every 100 females, there were 90.1 males.  For every 100 females age 18 and over, there were 87.9 males.

The median income for a household in the city was $23,391, and the median income for a family was $29,751. Males had a median income of $24,883 versus $18,193 for females. The per capita income for the city was $12,951.  About 20.4% of families and 25.1% of the population were below the poverty line, including 32.5% of those under age 18 and 16.4% of those age 65 or over.

Education

Schools in the area 
The Putnam County School District holds grades Headstart to grade twelve, and consists of one primary school, an elementary school, a middle school, a high school, and an alternative school. The district has 165 full-time teachers and more than 2,474 students. Gatewood Schools, a private Christian school in the area serves children in grades K3-12.
Gatewood Schools (K3-12)
Putnam County Primary School
Putnam County Elementary School
Putnam County Middle School
Putnam County High School
Putnam County Achievement Academy

Notable people
Vincent Hancock, Olympic gold medalist in men's skeet shooting at the 2008, 2012, and 2020 Summer Olympics and Gatewood Schools graduate, resides in Eatonton.

Dwight York, American cult leader and founder of the Nuwaubian Nation, currently imprisoned at ADX Florence.

The city is the birthplace of several noted writers, such as Joel Chandler Harris (journalist and author of the Uncle Remus stories), 19th century poet Louise Prudden Hunt (Mrs. B. W. Hunt), Henry Grady Weaver, author of The Mainspring of Human Progress, and Alice Walker, author of the novel The Color Purple and other fiction. 

Artist and leading scholar, curator, and promoter of African American art David Driskell was a native of Eatonton.

S. Truett Cathy, founder of Chick-fil-A fast food restaurant and franchise, is a native of the town.

Thomas Adiel Sherwood, Justice of the Missouri Supreme Court from 1873 to 1902, was born there.

References

External links
  City of Eatonton

Cities in Georgia (U.S. state)
Cities in Putnam County, Georgia
County seats in Georgia (U.S. state)
1807 establishments in Georgia (U.S. state)